Hannelore Schmatz (16 February 1940 – 2 October 1979) was a German mountaineer who was the fourth woman to summit Mount Everest. She collapsed and died as she was returning from summiting Everest via the southern route;  Schmatz was the first woman and first German citizen to die on the upper slopes of Everest.

Biography
Schmatz was on an expedition via the South East Ridge route with her husband, Gerhard Schmatz, when she died at 8,300 metres (27,200 ft). Gerhard Schmatz was the expedition leader, then 50 years of age, and the oldest man to summit Everest. On the same expedition was the American Ray Genet, who also died while descending from the summit. Ray Genet died later that night and both the Sherpa and Schmatz were distressed, but decided to continue their descent. Then at  Schmatz sat down, said "Water, Water" to her Sherpa and died. Sungdare Sherpa, one of the Sherpa guides, remained with her body, and as a result, lost most of his fingers and toes.

Genet's body ultimately disappeared under the snow, but Schmatz's body remained where she died on the mountain.

Body 
For years, Schmatz's remains could be seen by anyone attempting to summit Everest by the southern route.

During a 1981 expedition Sungdare Sherpa was the guide again for a new group of climbers. He had refused at first due to losing his fingers and toes during the 1979 expedition, but was paid extra by climber Chris Kopcjynski. During this climb down as they passed Schmatz's body, Kopcjynski was shocked, thinking it was a tent and stated "We did not touch it. I could see she had on her watch still."

In 1984, police inspector Yogendra Bahadur Thapa fell to his death while trying to recover Schmatz's body on a Nepalese police expedition.

British mountaineer Chris Bonington spotted Schmatz from a distance in 1985, and initially mistook her body for a tent until he got a closer look.

Lene Gammelgaard, the first Scandinavian woman to reach the peak of Everest, quotes the Norwegian mountaineer and expedition leader Arne Næss Jr. describing his encounter with Schmatz's remains, in her book Climbing High: A Woman's Account of Surviving the Everest Tragedy (1999), which recounts her own 1996 expedition. Næss' description is as follows:

The wind eventually blew Schmatz's remains over the edge and down Kangshung Face.

See also
List of people who died climbing Mount Everest

References

1940 births
1979 deaths
Deaths from hypothermia
German mountain climbers
Mountaineering deaths on Mount Everest
Mummies
Deceased Everest summiters
Female climbers